Lee Walter Congdon (born August 11, 1939) is a writer and historian.

Congdon is the author of four books.  The first three were The Young Lukacs (1983), Exile and Social Thought (1991), and Seeing Red (2001). Taken together, the works represent a trilogy examining the unique contributions of Hungarian intellectuals to 20th century social and political thought.  His fourth book was George Kennan: A Writing Life (2008).  Congdon also coedited two books on the Hungarian Revolution.

Congdon holds a bachelor's degree from Wheaton College (Illinois) and a masters and Ph.D. from Northern Illinois University.

In 1999 Congdon was awarded the Order of Merit - Small Cross by the Republic of Hungary. In 2006 Congdon retired as Professor of History at James Madison University, after more than thirty years of teaching.  He lives in Harrisonburg, Virginia, United States, with his wife.  Congdon is an Eastern Orthodox Christian.

In the fall of 2002 Congdon was interviewed in the James Madison University Magazine Montpelier:
Politically, for instance, Congdon veers right of the American right, meaning, within a European context, he is a monarchist. He sees little difference between the competing ideologies of America’s political parties and he professes an abiding admiration and preference over the common-denominator chaos of American democracy for some of Europe’s royalist governments of the latter 19th century, wherein "liberty—not equality—was the highest political value. For European conservatives," Congdon says, "order is first and liberty only within a context of order."

Notes and references

External links

Lee Congdon official website

1939 births
Living people
Northern Illinois University alumni
Wheaton College (Illinois) alumni
James Madison University faculty
American male writers
American monarchists
Recipients of the Order of Merit of the Republic of Hungary